Familjen Anderssons sjuka jul ("The Andersson Family's Sick Christmas") was the 1998 edition of Sveriges Radio's Christmas Calendar. Based on the Sune books, it was also released as a book in 1998.

Plot
In the Andersson family, mother Karin suddenly turns ill. She has to rest, and is sent to the hospital. Rudolf, the father, has to take care of the family himself.

The series received positive reception for, among other things, tackling that Christmas is celebrated in remembrance of the birth of Jesus.

References

1998 children's books
1998 radio programme debuts
1998 radio programme endings
Sune books
Sveriges Radio's Christmas Calendar
1998 Swedish novels